The family Campanulaceae (also bellflower family), of the order Asterales, contains nearly 2400 species in 84 genera of herbaceous plants, shrubs, and rarely small trees, often with milky sap.  Among them are several familiar garden plants belonging to the genera Campanula (bellflower), Lobelia, and Platycodon (balloonflower). Campanula rapunculus (rampion or r. bellflower) and Codonopsis lanceolata are eaten as vegetables. Lobelia inflata (indian tobacco), L. siphilitica and L. tupa (devil's tobacco) and others have been used as medicinal plants. Campanula rapunculoides (creeping bellflower) may be a troublesome weed, particularly in gardens, while Legousia spp. may occur in arable fields.

Most current classifications include the segregate family Lobeliaceae in Campanulaceae as subfamily Lobelioideae. A third subfamily, Cyphioideae, includes the genus Cyphia, and sometimes also the genera Cyphocarpus, Nemacladus, Parishella and Pseudonemacladus. Alternatively, the last three genera are placed in Nemacladoideae, while Cyphocarpus is placed in its own subfamily, Cyphocarpoideae.

This family is almost cosmopolitan, occurring on all continents except Antarctica. In addition, species of the family are native to many remote oceanic islands and archipelagos. Hawaii is particularly rich, with well over 100 endemic species of Hawaiian lobelioids. Continental areas with high diversity are South Africa, California and the northern Andes.

Habitats range from extreme deserts to rainforests and lakes, from the tropics to the high Arctic (Campanula uniflora), and from sea cliffs to high alpine habitats.

Description
Although most Campanulaceae are perennial herbs (sometimes climbing, as in Codonopsis), there is also a large number of annuals e.g. species of Legousia.  Isotoma hypocrateriformis is a succulent annual from Australia's dry interior. There are also biennials, e.g. the commonly cultivated ornamental Campanula medium (Canterbury bells). Many perennial campanuloids grow in rock-crevices, such as Musschia aurea (Madeira) and Petromarula pinnata (Crete). Some lobelioids also grow on rocks, e.g. the peculiar perennial stem succulent Brighamia rockii in Hawaii. Insular and tropical montane species in particular are often more or less woody and may bear the leaves in a dense rosette. When, in addition, the plant is unbranched, the result may be a palm- or treefern-like habit, as in species of the hawaiian genus Cyanea, which comprises the tallest of Campanulaceae, C. leptostegia (up to 14 m). Lysipomia are minute cushion plants of the high Andes, while gigant rosette-forming lobelias (e.g., Lobelia deckenii) are a characteristic component of the vegetation in the alpine zone on the tropical African volcanoes. In the Himalaya Campanula modesta and Cyananthus microphyllus reach even higher, probably setting the altitudinal record for the family at 4800 m. Several species are associated with freshwater, such as Lobelia dortmanna, an isoetid common in oligotrophic lakes in the boreal zone of North America and Europe, and Howellia aquatilis, an elodeid growing in ponds in SW North America.

There is usually abundant, white latex, but occasionally the exudate is clear and/or very sparse, as in Jasione.

Tubers occur in several genera, e.g. Cyphia.

Leaves are often alternate, more rarely opposite (e. g. Codonopsis) or whorled (Ostrowskia). They are simple (Petromarula one of very few exceptions) entire (repeatedly divided in spp. of Cyanea), but often with dentate margin. Stipules are absent.

Inflorescences are quite diverse, including both cymose and racemose types. In Jasione they are strongly condensed and resemble asteraceous capitula. In a few species, e. g. Cyananthus lobatus, flowers are solitary.

Flowers are bisexual (dioecious in Dialypetalum) and protandrous. Petals are fused into a corolla with 3 to 8 lobes. It may be bell- or star-shaped in subfamily Campanuloideae, while tubular and bilaterally symmetric in most Lobelioideae. Blue of various shades is the most common petal colour, but purple, red, pink, orange, yellow, white, and green also occur. The corolla may be down to 1 mm wide and long in some species of Wahlenbergia. At the other extreme, it reaches a width of 15 cm in Ostrowskia.

Stamens are equal in number to, and alternating with the petals. Anthers may be fused into a tube, as in all species of Lobelioideae and some Campanuloideae (e.g. Symphyandra)

Within the family pollen grains are often tricolporate, less commonly triporate, tricolpate, or pantoporate.

Carpel number is usually 2, 3 or 5 (8 in Ostrowskia), and corresponds to the number of stigmatic lobes.

The style is in various ways involved in the "presentation" of the pollen, as in several other families of the order Asterales. In Lobelioideae, pollen is, already in the bud stage, released into the tube formed by the anthers. During flowering, it is pushed up by the elongating style and "presented" to visiting pollinators at the apex of the tube, a mechanism described as a pollen pump. The style eventually protrudes through the anther tube, and becomes receptive to pollen. In Campanuloideae, the pollen is instead packed between hairs on the style, gradually being released as the hairs invaginate. Subsequently, the stigmatic lobes unfold, and become receptive.

Bees and birds (particularly hummingbirds and hawaiian honeycreepers) are probably the most common pollinators of Campanulaceae. A few confirmed and many probable cases of bat-pollination are known, particularly in the genus Burmeistera. Brighamia and Hippobroma have pale or white flowers with a long-tubed corolla, and are pollinated by hawkmoths. Pollination by lizards has been reported for Musschia aurea and Nesocodon mauritianus.

The ovary is usually inferior or, in some species, semi-inferior. Very rarely is it completely superior (e.g. Cyananthus). In Campanumoea javanica, calyx and corolla diverge from the ovary at different levels.

Berries are a common fruit-type in Lobelioideae (Burmeistera, Clermontia, Centropogon, Cyanea etc.), whilst rare in Campanuloideae (Canarina being one of few examples). Capsules, with very varying modes of dehiscence, are otherwise the predominating fruit type in the family.

Seeds are mostly small (<2 mm) and numerous.

Subfamilies and genera
The Angiosperm Phylogeny Website divides the family into five subfamilies.

Campanuloideae

 Adenophora - Europe and Asia
 Asyneuma - S. Europe and Asia
 Azorina - Azores
 Berenice - Réunion	 
 Campanula - mostly N hemisphere
 Campanulastrum Small (may be included in Campanula)
 Canarina - Canary Islands and E Africa
 Codonopsis - E Asia
 Craterocapsa - South Africa
 Cryptocodon - C Asia
 Cyananthus - E Asia
 Cyclocodon Griff. ex Hook.f. & Thomson
 Cylindrocarpa - C Asia
 Echinocodon - China
 Edraianthus - SE Europe and W Asia
 Favratia Feer
 Feeria - Morocco
 Githopsis - W N America
 Gunillaea - Tropical Africa and Madagascar
 Hanabusaya - Korea
 Heterochaenia - Réunion
 Heterocodon - SW N America
 Himalacodon D.Y.Hong & Qiang Wang (may be included in Codonopsis)
 Homocodon - China
 Jasione - Europe and SW Asia
 Kericodon Cupido
 Legousia - Europe and N Africa
 Merciera - South Africa
 Michauxia - Middle East
 Microcodon - South Africa
 Muehlbergella Feer
 Musschia - Madeira
 Namacodon - SW Africa
 Nesocodon - Mauritius
 Ostrowskia - C Asia
 Pankycodon D.Y.Hong & X.T.Ma (may be included in Codonopsis)
 Peracarpa - SE Asia
 Petromarula - Crete
 Physoplexis - Alps
 Phyteuma - Europe and Asia
 Platycodon - E Asia
 Prismatocarpus - Southern Africa
 Pseudocodon D.Y.Hong & H.Sun (may be included in Codonopsis)
 Rhigiophyllum - South Africa
 Roella - South Africa
 Rotanthella Morin (may be included in Campanula)
 Sachokiella Kolak.
 Sergia - C Asia
 Siphocodon - South Africa
 Theilera - South Africa
 Theodorovia - C Asia
 Trachelium - SE Europe, Middle East and C Asia
 Treichelia - South Africa
 Triodanis - Americas and S Europe
 Wahlenbergia - mostly Southern hemisphere
 Zeugandra - Iran

Lobelioideae

 Apetahia - Society Islands
 Brighamia - Hawaii
 Burmeistera - N Andes and C America
 Centropogon - Neotropics
 Clermontia - Hawaii
 Cyanea - Hawaii
 Delissea - Hawaii
 Dialypetalum - Madagascar
 Diastatea - Neotropics
 Dielsantha - Tropical Africa
 Downingia - W N America and S S America
 Grammatotheca - South Africa
 Heterotoma - Mexico
 Hippobroma - W Indies
 Howellia - SW N America
 Isotoma - Australia
 Legenere - California
 Lobelia, including Hypsela, Laurentia, Pratia, Trimeris  - cosmopolitan
 Lysipomia - Andes
 Monopsis - Southern Africa
 Palmerella - California
 Porterella - SW N America
 Ruthiella - New Guinea
 Sclerotheca - Society Islands
 Siphocampylus - Neotropics
 Solenopsis - S Europe and N Africa
 Trematolobelia - Hawaii
 Unigenes - South Africa
 Wimmerella - South Africa

Cyphioideae
 Cyphia - Africa

Cyphocarpoideae
 Cyphocarpus - N Chile

Nemacladoideae
 Nemacladus, syn. Parishella - SW N America
 Pseudonemacladus - Mexico

, Plants of the World Online includes some genera in Campanulaceae that are not included by the Angiosperm Phylogeny Website:

Eastwoodiella Morin
Hesperocodon Eddie & Cupido
Lithotoma E.B.Knox
Melanocalyx (Fed.) Morin
Palustricodon Morin
Poolea Morin
Protocodon Morin
Ravenella Morin
Smithiastrum Morin
Wimmeranthus Rzed.

Fossil record
The earliest known occurrence of Campanulaceae pollen is from Oligocene strata. Earliest Campanulaceae macrofossils dated, are seeds of †Campanula paleopyramidalis from  17-16  million years old Miocene deposits in the Nowy Sacz, Carpathians, Poland. It is a close relative of the extant Campanula pyramidalis.

Chemical compounds
Members of subfamily Lobelioideae contain the alkaloid lobeline. The principal storage carbohydrate of Campanulaceae is inulin, a fructan also occurring in the related Asteraceae.

Literature

References

External links
Topwalks
Flowers in Israel 

 
Asterales families